Ever since the 2007 municipal reform, and prior to this election, John Brædder from local party Guldborgsundlisten had been mayor of Guldborgsund Municipality. However it was only in the last election
, that his party won the most seats. 

For this election, Mandag Morgen, who had made an article predicting the 98 mayors that would follow the elections, gave John Brædder and his party good chances to continue. 

However, the 'winners' of the election would be the Social Democrats, who managed to win 9 seats, 3 more than in 2017. On the other hand, Guldborgsundlisten lost 4 seats, and ended with 7 seats. The third biggest party would become Danish People's Party, who won 6 seats, and 19.0% of the vote, the highest in any of the 98 municipal elections in 2017. Both the blocs had won 11 seats, so the 7 seats of Guldborgsundlisten still had a chance to come into play. However, Danish People's Party ended up going together with the red bloc, and Simon Hansen could become the first mayor from a non-local party in the history of the municipality.

Electoral system
For elections to Danish municipalities, a number varying from 9 to 31 are chosen to be elected to the municipal council. The seats are then allocated using the D'Hondt method and a closed list proportional representation.
Guldborgsund Municipality had 29 seats in 2021

Unlike in Danish General Elections, in elections to municipal councils, electoral alliances are allowed.

Electoral alliances 

Electoral Alliance 1

Electoral Alliance 2

Electoral Alliance 2

Results

Notes

References 

Guldborgsund